{{Infobox station
 | name=South Orange
 | style=NJ Transit
 | image= So Orange sta Sloan sunny jeh.jpg
 | image_size=
 | image_caption=South Orange station at the southwest corner of South Orange Avenue and Sloan Street.
 | address= 15 Sloan Street, South Orange, New Jersey
 | coordinates= 
 | line=
 | other= NJT Bus: 92 and 107 ONE Bus: 31 | platform=1 side platform and 1 island platform
 | levels=
 | tracks=3
 | parking=
 | bicycle=
 | baggage_check=
 | passengers=4,131 (average weekday)
 | pass_year=2017
 | pass_percent=
 | pass_system=
 | opened=September 17, 1837 (preliminary trip)September 28, 1837 (regular service)
 | closed=
 | rebuilt=February 1, 1916
 | electrified=September 22, 1930
 | ADA= Yes (mini-platform)
 | code=
 | owned=New Jersey Transit
 | zone=5
 | former=
 | services= 
 | other_services_header = Former services
 | other_services_collapsible = yes
 | other_services = 
 | mpassengers=
  | nrhp=

}}South Orange''' is a New Jersey Transit station in South Orange, New Jersey along the Morris and Essex (formerly Erie Lackawanna) rail line. It is located in the business district of South Orange, near its town hall. It is one of two train stations in the township of South Orange, Mountain Station being the other near the township border. South Orange station was built by the Lackawanna Railroad in 1916.

History
Station owner New Jersey Transit decided to perform work at South Orange station to improve accessibility for the handicapped and to repair ninety-year-old viaducts at the station. At a cost of $22.9 million, repair work at South Orange, along with other nearby stations commenced in 2004. South Orange received a mini-high level platform as a result of the repairs, and the tracks surrounding the station were upgraded to have concrete ties and the stairways leading towards the platforms were replaced.

Station layout and service
As with nearly all stations on the Morris & Essex Lines east of Summit, there are three tracks at South Orange station numbered according to the scheme that was established by the Lackawanna Railroad. Track 1, the express track, is the middle of the three tracks and is served by trains in the peak rush hour direction. Track 2, the southernmost track, serves eastbound trains heading towards Hoboken and New York. Track 3 is the northernmost track and handles westbound trains to Dover, Gladstone, and Hackettstown.

The western end of the platform for tracks 1 and 3 and the eastern end of the platform for track 2 contain high-level sections of platform. Installed in 2004, these allow those with handicaps to board and bring the station in compliance with ADA regulations. There are a number of retail stores at street level, below the station building. As of 2022, these stores are Cait & Abby's Bakery, Starbucks, Super Cuts, On the Track Cleaners, Cold Stone Creamery, and Village Diner.

See also
Operating Passenger Railroad Stations Thematic Resource (New Jersey)
List of New Jersey Transit stations

References

External links

 South Orange Avenue entrance from Google Maps Street View

NJ Transit Rail Operations stations
Railway stations in Essex County, New Jersey
Railway stations on the National Register of Historic Places in New Jersey
Former Delaware, Lackawanna and Western Railroad stations
South Orange, New Jersey
Railway stations in the United States opened in 1837
1837 establishments in New Jersey